Oujiang Beikou Bridge is a suspension bridge between Yueqing and Dongtou District, Wenzhou City, in Zhejiang Province, China. It is an important part of the Yongguan Expressway and China National Highway 228. It is the world's first three-tower four-span double-decked steel truss suspension bridge. The construction cost was 8.836 billion yuan (2022: ~ US$1.32 billion), and construction started on 30 November 2016. The main bridge was finished on 30 December 2021, and the upper floor was opened to traffic on 27 May 2022，lower floor was opened to traffic on 31 August 2022.

Design 
Due to the height limit of the nearby Wenzhou Longwan International Airport, the bridge tower could not be built too high, and if the bridge tower was built too low, it would affect the Ou River, so it was designed as the world's first three-tower four-span suspension bridge. The upper level is a two-way six-lane expressway, and the lower level is a two-way six-lane first-class highway.

See also 
 List of longest suspension bridge spans

References

External links 
 Oujiang Beikou Bridge Project Introduction Video

Bridges completed in 2022
Suspension bridges in China
Coordinates on Wikidata